David Collins (born 17 March 1984) is an Irish hurler who currently plays as a right corner-back for the Galway senior team. He joined the team in 2004 and has been a regular member until 2016.

An All-Ireland medalist in the under-21 grade, Collins has been a stalwart on the Galway team for almost a decade.  He has won one Leinster winners' medal, two National Hurling League winners' medals and one Vodafone Young Hurler of the Year award. He ended up as an All-Ireland runner-up on three occasions.

At club level Collins plays with the Liam Mellows club in Galway. Won a senior league with Liam Mellows in 2016 as a centre back.

Early life and education
Collins attended St. Joseph's Patrician College.

Playing career

Club
Collins plays his club hurling with his local Liam Mellows GAA club in Galway.  He has had some success at underage level, however, the club hadn't won a senior county club championship title since 1970 until Sunday 3 December 2017.

Inter-county
Collins first came to prominence on the inter-county scene as a member of the Galway minor hurling team.  He enjoyed little success in this grade but later played with the under-21 county side. He won an All-Ireland medal with the Galway under-21 team in 2005 following a 1–15 to 1–14 defeat of Kilkenny.

By this stage Collins was a regular on the Galway senior team. He won a National League winners medal in 2004 as Galway defeated Waterford by 2–15 to 1–13. Later that year he made his championship debut at centre-back against Down.

In 2005 Galway defeated both Tipperary and Kilkenny in the All-Ireland series to qualify for an All-Ireland final showdown with Cork. It was the first meeting of Cork and Galway in an All-Ireland final since 1990. Men from the west had never beaten Cork in a championship decider. Neither side broke away into a considerable lead, however, at the final whistle, Cork was ahead by 1–21 to 1–16. In spite of this defeat, Collins ended the year as the Vodafone Young Hurler of the Year.

In 2007 Collins was appointed Galway captain.

After a number of disappointing seasons, Collins won a second National League medal in 2010 following a 2–22 to 1–17 defeat of Cork.

In 2012, Galway shocked reigning All-Ireland champions Kilkenny and won a historic Leinster title by 2–21 to 2–11. It was Collins' first provincial winners' medal in any grade. He was dropped from Galway panel in 2016.

Honours

Team
Galway
Leinster Senior Hurling Championship (1): 2012
National Hurling League (2): 2004, 2010
All-Ireland Under-21 Hurling Championship (1): 2005
Connacht Under-21 Hurling Championship (1): 2005

Connacht
Interprovincial Hurling Championship (1): 2004

Club:

Galway Senior Hurling Championship (1): 2017

Individual
Vodafone Young Hurler of the Year (1): 2005
 All-Star (1): 2012

References

1984 births
Living people
Connacht inter-provincial hurlers
Galway inter-county hurlers
Liam Mellows hurlers
People educated at St Joseph's Patrician College
People from Galway (city)